Bourget may refer to:

People
 Barbara Bourget (born 1950) Canadian artistic director 
 Claude Marc Bourget (born 1956) Canadian musician, writer and journalist
 Ignace Bourget (1799–1885), French-Canadian Roman Catholic priest and bishop of the Diocese of Montreal.
 Maurice Bourget (1907–1979) Canadian politician
 Paul Bourget (1852–1935), French novelist and critic
 Robert Bourget-Pailleron (1897–1970), French novelist

French communes
 Le Bourget, Seine-Saint-Denis département
Le Bourget-du-Lac, Savoie département
Bourget-en-Huile, Savoie département
Villarodin-Bourget, Savoie département

Other

 Le Bourget Airport, an airport near Paris
 Lac du Bourget, the largest lake in the French Alps
 Bourget, Ontario
 Bourget (electoral district), a provincial electoral district in Quebec

French-language surnames